The Livingstone Medal is awarded by the Royal Scottish Geographical Society in recognition of outstanding service of a humanitarian nature with a clear geographical dimension. This was awarded first in 1901.

Named after the African explorer David Livingstone it was endowed in 1901 by his daughter, Agnes Livingstone Bruce. Designed by the sculptor James Pittendrigh MacGillivray, it has a portrait of Livingstone on the front and a depiction of the Spirit of Civilisation on the reverse.

Recipients
Source: RSGS

See also
List of geography awards
List of awards named after people

References

Awards of the Royal Scottish Geographical Society
Awards established in 1901
1901 establishments in Scotland
David Livingstone